Dag Hammarskjöld Stadium was a multi-use stadium in Ndola, Zambia, named after former Secretary-General of the United Nations Dag Hammarskjöld.  It was used mostly for football matches and served as the home for Ndola United Football Club. The stadium had a capacity of 18,000 people.  In 1988 the stadium was razed to pave way for a new stadium. Construction of the new stadium didn't begin until 2001, and it is not known whether construction will continue.

References

Football venues in Zambia
Ndola
Buildings and structures in Copperbelt Province